Maia Tabet is an Arabic-English literary translator with a background in editing and journalism. Born in Beirut, Lebanon, in 1956, she was raised in Lebanon, India, and England. She studied philosophy and political science at the American University in Beirut and lives in the United States.

Career 
Tabet is noted for her translation of two novels by Lebanese author Elias Khoury: Little Mountain and White Masks. The former was the first Khoury novel to appear in English translation (in 1989) while the second was nominated for the 2011 Saif Ghobash–Banipal Prize for Arabic Literary Translation and won the judges' commendation. She has co-translated, with Michael K. Scott, the controversial Throwing Sparks (Tarmee bi-Sharar) by Saudi writer Abdo Khal, a novel which garnered the 2010 International Prize for Arabic Fiction (IPAF), aka the Arabic Booker Prize. In 2018, her translation of Sinan Antoon's Ya Mariam was published asThe Baghadad Eucharist (AUC Press), and  The Monotonous Chaos of Existence (Mason Jar Press), a collection of short stories by Jordanian author, poet, and activist Hisham Bustani, came out in early 2022. She is currently working on finishing the translation of 'Albet al-Daou (tentatively titled Camera Obscura in English) by Lebanese novelist, poet, and academic, Rula Jurdi.

Tabet has also translated short stories, novel excerpts, and lyrical essays by Iman Humaydan, Najwa Barakat, Alawiya Subh, Hala Kawtharani, Abbas Beydoun, and Elias Khoury (Lebanon), as well as Khaled Khalifa, Zakaria Tamer (Syria), and Elias Farkouh (Jordan), Ahmed Fagih (Libya), Habib Selmi (Tunisia), Luay Hamza Abbas (Iraq), Ali Muqri (Yemen), and Amir Tag Elsir (Sudan). Her work has appeared in Banipal: Magazine of Modern Arab Literature, Fikrun wa Fann (a publication of the Goethe Institut), Portal 9, Rusted Radishes, Words without Borders, The Punch Magazine, The Common, and the Journal of Palestine Studies, among others.

In addition to her work as an Arabic-English literary translator, Tabet is the associate editor of the Journal of Palestine Studies. in addition to her commitment to social justice, she his committed to environmental sustainability and has an abiding interest in the history and art of cooking . She is the mother of two adult daughters.

See also
 List of Arabic-English translators
 Contemporary Arabic literature by women writers

References

Living people
Writers from Beirut
Arabic–English translators
Women chefs
Lebanese chefs
Year of birth missing (living people)